Murphy's Law is an American crime drama that starred George Segal and Maggie Han, loosely based on the Trace and Digger novels by Warren Murphy. The opening theme song, which replaced an instrumental by Mike Post, was an edited version of "Murphy's Law," a song featured on the album "High Crime" by Al Jarreau. The series premiered November 2, 1988 on ABC. On March 9, 1989, ABC announced that it had canceled the series and that the final episode would air on March 18, 1989. The actual final, unaired episode, entitled "Alls Wrong That Ends Wrong," resolved a key storyline in the series (recovering alcoholic Murphy was awarded custody of his daughter from his estranged ex-wife) and also served an unsold pilot for a spin-off starring Joan Severance

Synopsis
Daedelus Patrick Murphy (Segal) was a recovering alcoholic who worked as an insurance-fraud investigator for First Fidelity Insurance. His unusual methods sometimes led him to clash with office executive Victor Beaudine, though supervisor Wesley Harden often ran interference for Murphy since his methods got results. He lived with girlfriend and fashion model Kimiko Fannuchi (Han), while attempting to reconnect with his estranged daughter. In the actual final, unaired episode, entitled "Alls Wrong That Ends Wrong," Murphy was awarded custody of his daughter from his estranged ex-wife. The episode also served as an unsold pilot for a proposed spin-off starring Joan Severance as an insurance investigator.

Cast

Main
George Segal as Daedalus Patrick Murphy 
Maggie Han as Kimiko Fannuchi
Josh Mostel as Wesley Harden
Sarah Sawatsky as Kathleen Danforth
Charles Rocket as Victor Beaudine
Kim Lankford as Marissa Danforth
Serge Houde as Ed

Guest Stars
  Gerard Christopher
  Will Estes
  Norman Fell
  Clyde Kusatsu
  Patrick Macnee
  Reni Santoni
  Joan Severance
  John Standing
  Julia Sweeney

Episodes
Twelve episodes are registered with the United States Copyright Office.

References

External links

1988 American television series debuts
1989 American television series endings
1980s American drama television series
American Broadcasting Company original programming